SIMEC Atlantis Energy (formerly: Atlantis Resources) is a renewable energy company. It is incorporated in Singapore, but its operational headquarters are in Edinburgh, Scotland, United Kingdom. Initially, it was a developer of the tidal power turbines and projects, but after becoming a part of GFG Alliance it has expanded its business also to the waste-to-energy and hydropower.

History 
In February 2014, Atlantis became the world's first tidal energy company to float on the London Stock Exchange's AIM sub-market and commenced construction on MeyGen, Europe's largest tidal power project in the Pentland Firth. On 20 February 2017, the company announced that it had completed the phase 1a of the Meygen project. This phase included the design, manufacture and deployment of four 1.5 MW turbines. The project received £1.5 million Scottish Government grant in 2020.

A number of strategic investments and acquisitions occurred in late 2015 and throughout 2016.

In 2017, GFG Alliance acquired 49.99% stake in the company in return of the coal-fired Uskmouth power station, which will be converted to the waste-to-energy plant. Consequently, Atlantis Resources was renamed SIMEC Atlantis Energy. In 2019, it acquired the Scottish hydro developer Green Highland Renewables. In early 2021 the planning was called-in by the Welsh Government for the development of Uskmouth power station, putting the project in doubt.

In 2020, it created a subsidiary Atlantis Operations Japan, which will build a tidal turbine between the southern Japanese islands of Hisaka and Naru islands for Kyuden Mirai Energy.

Operations 
Atlantis has commercial and project development teams based in Edinburgh, an operations base located at Nigg Energy Park in Invergordon and the turbine and engineering services division is located in Bristol. Through its subsidiaries, the company develops or operates the 6 MW Meygen tidal turbine array in Pentland Firth, Scotland, a 160 MW Wyre tidal barrage on the River Wyre, and the 220 MW waste-to-energy Uskmouth power project.

In the cooperation with the China Shipbuilding Industry Corporation and the China Three Gorges Corporation, it helped to design the 500-kilowatt tidal-stream turbine which was installed between Putuoshan and Huludao islands in the Zhoushan archipelago, China. In Japan, it supplies the 500-kilowatt tidal-stream turbine which will be launched between Hisaka and Naru. In France, SIMEC Atlantis Energy holds 49% stake in Normandie Hydroliennes, the marine energy development company which develops 12 MW tidal power project in Raz Blanchard.

References

External links
 

Companies listed on the Alternative Investment Market
Electric power companies of Scotland
Renewable energy companies of Scotland
Tidal power in Scotland
Companies based in Edinburgh
Tidal power companies of the United Kingdom
Electric power companies of Singapore
Renewable energy technology companies